The 1966 European Figure Skating Championships were held in Bratislava, Czechoslovakia from February 1 to 5. Elite senior-level figure skaters from European ISU member nations competed for the title of European Champion in the disciplines of men's singles, ladies' singles, pair skating, and ice dancing.

Results

Men

Ladies

Pairs

Ice dancing

References

External links
 results

European Figure Skating Championships, 1966
European Figure Skating Championships, 1966
European Figure Skating Championships
International figure skating competitions hosted by Czechoslovakia
Sports competitions in Bratislava
1960s in Bratislava
February 1966 sports events in Europe